Ambohidrapeto is a rural municipality in Analamanga Region, in the  Central Highlands of Madagascar. It belongs to the district of Antananarivo-Atsimondrano and its populations numbers to 15,965 in 2019.

Agriculture
70% of the population are farmers. Manioc, rice, sweet potatoes, beans, tomatoes and potatoes are the most grown agricultural products.

References

Populated places in Analamanga